is a Japanese manga series by Nami Sano. It was serialized in Enterbrain's seinen manga magazine Harta from July 2017 to November 2021 and was collected in seven tankōbon volumes. An anime television series adaptation by Geek Toys and CompTown has been announced.

Characters

In cooperation with his brother Dali, he was adopted by the Sonoyama family.  He is the more emotional of the twins and unlike his more serious and manipulative twin brother Dali, he is gentle and sometimes tends to get distracted from the goal, he has a richer, smoother expression.  His dominant hand is his right.

In cooperation with his brother Migi, he was adopted by the Sonoyama family.  He is the more rational of the twins and calmly weighs things up with his brother's feelings, but as the older twin there are times when he is tough in front of Migi.  His dominant hand is his left.

Media

Manga
Migi to Dali is written and illustrated by Nami Sano. It was serialized in Enterbrain's Harta manga magazine from July 2017 to November 2021 and was collected in seven tankōbon volumes.

Anime
On December 13, 2021, an anime adaptation was announced.  It was later revealed to be a television series produced by Geek Toys and CompTown, and directed and written by Mankyū, with Ayumi Nishibata designing the characters, and Hiroko Sebu composing the music.

References

External links
Migi to Dali at ComicWalker 
Migi to Dali official anime website 

Anime and manga about revenge
Anime series based on manga
Enterbrain manga
Geek Toys
Kadokawa Dwango franchises
Mystery anime and manga
Seinen manga
Upcoming anime television series